"Moments in Soul" was the only hit single by JT and the Big Family, an early 1990s group from Italy. It has become their trademark song and reached #7 on the UK Singles Chart in March 1990. The song samples Art of Noise's "Moments in Love" and Soul II Soul's "Back To Life".

The group released a second single, a cover of the Mike Oldfield hit "Foreign Affair", which reached #90 in the UK.

References

1990 debut singles
1989 songs